Matthew Shiltz (born December 7, 1992) is a gridiron football quarterback for the Hamilton Tiger-Cats of the Canadian Football League (CFL). He played NCAA football for the Butler Bulldogs. Shiltz made his professional debut for the Montreal Alouettes in 2017.

College career 
Shiltz attended Butler University and was the starting quarterback for the Bulldogs for part of 2014 and all of the 2015 season. In his first season he completed 106 of 171 pass attempts (62.0%) for 1,324 yards with 10 touchdowns and four interceptions. In his senior season Shiltz attempted 381 passes, of which he completed 218 (57.2%), for 2,713 yards with 19 touchdowns and nine interceptions. In 2015, he also ran the ball for 639 yards and 10 touchdowns.

Professional career

Montreal Alouettes 
After going undrafted in the 2016 NFL Draft Shiltz began working for Ernst & Young in Indianapolis at which time he was invited to the Montreal Alouettes' April mini-camp for the 2017 season. On April 4, 2017 he signed a contract with the Alouettes. On November 4, 2017, in the Montreal Alouettes final game of the 2017 CFL season, he started his first professional game, completing seven of 16 passes for 96 yards before being replaced in the third quarter. Prior to the final game of the season, Shiltz had played three games in relief for injured Montreal quarterbacks, during which he completed 28 of 45 passes for 289 yards, including one touchdown.

In training camp for the 2018 season it was revealed that Shiltz and veteran Drew Willy were in contention for the starting role to open the season. Shiltz only played in two games during the 2018 season, completing 19 of 30 pass attempts for 194 yards with one touchdown and three interceptions. Shiltz entered the 2019 season as the team's third quarterback, behind Vernon Adams and Antonio Pipkin. Midway through the season Shiltz and the Alouettes agreed to a one-year contract extension. Shiltz was named the starting quarterback for the Alouettes in their Week 16 match against the BC Lions after Vernon Adams was suspended for one game. Shiltz completed 10 of 19 pass attempts for 177 yards with a touchdown and an interception: He also ran for 62 yards and a touchdown, but the game was lost on a goal line fumble from Antonio Pipkin.

Following the cancellation of the 2020 season Shiltz re-signed with the Alouettes on December 16, 2020. Late in the team's Week 10 match against the Redblacks starting quarterback Vernon Adams Jr suffered a shoulder injury, thrusting Shiltz into the starting role where he completed all three of his pass attempts for 36 yards setting up the game winning touchdown. The following week Shiltz started in place of Vernon Adams, and played well leading the Alouettes to a 27-16 win over the Ottawa Redblacks. The next day on October 17, 2021, the Alouettes announced that they had traded for veteran quarterback Trevor Harris, giving Shiltz competition for the position while he remained the team's starter for the next game. Shiltz threw two touchdown passes in a 37-16 win over the Toronto Argonauts. Shiltz ended up being benched for Harris during the following game, and was placed on the injured list, missing the rest of the season. As a pending free agent in 2022, Shiltz was released by the Alouettes on February 4, 2022.

Hamilton Tiger-Cats 
On February 6, 2022, it was announced that Shiltz had signed a one year contract with the Hamilton Tiger-Cats. His salary for the 2022 season was reported at $125,000. In late August 2022 it was announced that Shiltz would miss the next four-to-six weeks recovering from a wrist injury. At the time of the injury Shiltz had been splitting snaps at quarterback with starter Dane Evans. Shiltz finished the season having played in all but one of the regular season games, completing 85 of 119 pass attempts for 935 yards with four touchdowns and two interceptions. He also ran the ball 28 times for 152 yards with one score. On February 6, 2023 Shiltz and Hamilton agreed to a contract extension. He is expected to serve as the backup quarterback to Bo Levi Mitchell whom the club acquired in the off-season.

References

External links
Hamilton Tiger-Cats bio

Living people
1992 births
Canadian football quarterbacks
American football quarterbacks
American players of Canadian football
Hamilton Tiger-Cats players
Montreal Alouettes players
Butler Bulldogs football players
Ernst & Young people
Players of American football from Illinois
Sportspeople from Kane County, Illinois
People from St. Charles, Illinois